Suvali Beach was previously known as Suwally, Swally (anglicised version of Suvali), Swalley-Road, or Swally Beach. Suvali Beach is an urban beach along the Arabian Sea situated near the village of Suvali in the Hazira suburb of Surat in Gujarat State, India.

History
Suvali Beach was the gateway from where the East India Company made inroads into India. in 1612, Captain Thomas Best encountered and defeated the Portuguese at the Battle of Swally. Suvali Beach is also known as the birthplace of the modern Indian Navy

See also
 List of tourist attractions in Surat

References

Beaches of Surat
History of Surat